The Cape Republic also called the Cape of Good Hope is a proposed state that encompasses the Western Cape and the Eastern Cape in South Africa. The Cape Independence Party established itself in 2007 and wanted the Cape Republic to become a state independent of South Africa. The party is seeking a referendum so they can decide their future as an independent state.

Background

References

Geographical neologisms
Independence movements
Proposed countries
Separatism in South Africa
Politics of South Africa